The Himmelfarb Health Sciences Library was completed in 1973 during the presidency of Lloyd Elliott. The library serves the George Washington University School of Medicine and Health Sciences, the Milken Institute School of Public Health, and the George Washington University School of Nursing. The building is part of the Ross Hall Medical Complex, and has three floors above ground and one below ground. The library was named after Paul Himmelfarb.

North of the Library is the George Washington University Hospital and the Foggy Bottom–GWU Station.

Notes

External links 

George Washington University buildings and structures
University and college academic libraries in the United States
Libraries established in 1973
1973 establishments in Washington, D.C.